Francisco Páez (born 17 April 1979) is an Olympic swimmer from Venezuela. He swam for Venezuela at the 2000 Olympics. He also represented Venezuela at the 1999 Pan Am Games and the 1998 Central American & Caribbean Games

References

1979 births
Living people
Venezuelan male swimmers
Olympic swimmers of Venezuela
Swimmers at the 1999 Pan American Games
Swimmers at the 2000 Summer Olympics
Pan American Games medalists in swimming
Pan American Games bronze medalists for Venezuela
Central American and Caribbean Games gold medalists for Venezuela
Competitors at the 1998 Central American and Caribbean Games
Competitors at the 2002 Central American and Caribbean Games
Central American and Caribbean Games medalists in swimming
Medalists at the 1999 Pan American Games
20th-century Venezuelan people
21st-century Venezuelan people